Steinhardt is a surname of German origin. The name refers to:

Arnold Steinhardt (born 1937), American concert violinist
Jacob Steinhardt (1887–1968), German painter and woodcut artist
Joseph Steinhardt (1720–1776), German rabbi and Talmud scholar
Laurence Steinhardt (1892–1950), American diplomat; U.S. ambassador to several countries, including the USSR
Michael Steinhardt (born 1941), American financial manager and philanthropist
Nicolae Steinhardt (1912–1989), Romanian writer, Orthodox Christian hermit and father confessor
Paul Steinhardt (born 1952), American theoretical physicist and professor
Robby Steinhardt (1950–2021), American rock musician and singer

Jewish surnames
German-language surnames